In this page are contained all the lists of number-one singles from the Official Finnish Charts, the official Finnish music charts that began in 1989. Musiikkituottajat – IFPI Finland, the association of Finnish music industry, publishes currently three separate singles charts: the Official Finnish Singles Chart (Suomen virallinen singlelista) which takes into account both physical singles and digital tracks (singles, promotional singles and non-singles), the Official Finnish Download Chart (Suomen virallinen latauslista), which since February 2007 has listed tracks accordingly to their digital sales, and the Official Finnish Airplay Chart, which since 24 November 2013 has listed tracks accordingly to their airplay. On 5 April 2012 the Singles Chart began to include music streaming in addition to digital and physical sales.

Weekly singles charts
19881989
1990199119921993199419951996199719981999
2000200120022003200420052006200720082009
2010201120122013201420152016201720182019
2020202120222023

Milestones

Singles Chart

Most weeks at number one

Most total weeks on the chart

Download Chart

Most weeks at number one

Most total weeks on the chart

Airplay Chart

Most weeks at number one

Most total weeks on the chart

See also
The Official Finnish Charts
List of number-one albums (Finland)
Luettelot Suomen albumilistan ykkösistä vuosittain (1966–1988)  
 Luettelot Suomen virallisen albumilistan ykkösistä vuosittain (1989→) 
 Luettelot Suomen virallisen singlelistan ykkösistä (1951→)

References

External links
The Official Finnish Charts on IFPI Finland's website
Archives of Finnish Charts including singles and albums mid-1995 to present 
The Official Finnish Charts on FinnishCharts.com
Archives of Finnish Singles Chart

Finnish music